Masoncus is a genus of North American dwarf spiders that was first described by Ralph Vary Chamberlin in 1949.

Species
 it contains four species, found in Canada and the United States:
Masoncus arienus Chamberlin, 1949 (type) – USA, 
Masoncus conspectus (Gertsch & Davis, 1936) – USA
Masoncus dux Chamberlin, 1949 – Canada
Masoncus pogonophilus Cushing, 1995 – USA. Known myrmecophilic association with Pogonomyrmex badius, this spider lives in the nest and feeds on springtails.

See also
 List of Linyphiidae species (I–P)

References

Araneomorphae genera
Linyphiidae
Spiders of North America